Amadou Mahtar Ba is the Co-Founder and Executive Chairman of AllAfrica Global Media Inc, - owner and operator of AllAfrica.com - an international multi-media content service provider, systems technology developer and the largest distributor of African news and information worldwide. From 2009 until May 2014, he was Chief Executive of the African Media Initiative, a pan-African effort he established to provide the continent's media owners and practitioners with tools they need to play a stronger leadership role in their communities, countries and the region.

Career

Prior to starting AllAfrica, Ba served from 1996 to 2000 as Director of Communications and Marketing for BICIS Bank, a subsidiary of the French banking group BNP Paribas. From 1993 to 1996, Ba helped lead the successful restructuring and privatization of the Panafrican News Agency (PANA).

Amadou Mahtar Ba sits on several boards and participates in a number of international working groups including the UN Secretary General's High-Level Panel on Women's Economic Empowerment, the World Economic Forum Network of Global Agenda Councils, the Africa Democratic Institute, the Africa Policy Advisory Board of ONE and serves as a member of the Panel of Judges for the annual CNN African Journalist Award. Ba was educated in Senegal, France and Spain, and is fluent in French, English, Spanish, Fulani and Wolof. He holds a master's degree from the Ecole Française des Professionnels de la Communication in Paris and Paris 7 University (Jussieu).

Recognition
Ba has received many distinguished awards and recognitions in Africa, Europe, and the United States. Since the inception of its list, New African magazine selected Ba as one of the "100 Most Influential Africans" of 2011, 2012 and 2013. Forbes listed him as one of "The Top 10 Most Powerful Men in Africa" in February 2014. The Millennium Africa Foundation presented him in 2014 with its Lifetime Achievement Award alongside laureates Goodluck Jonathan, President of the Federal Republic of Nigeria, and Dr. Donald Kaberuka, President of the African Development Bank.  Ba is also included as one of the top 500 Africans contributing to the rise of the continent by Africa24 magazine. EXPO 2015 and Afronline awarded Ba the 2012 African Media Prize for his "outstanding contribution to African Media and his skills on promoting innovation among African Media."

References

External links 
 

Living people
Year of birth missing (living people)
Place of birth missing (living people)
Senegalese businesspeople
Media executives